The General Assembly (French romanization: "Medjliss Oumoumi" ) or Genel Parlamento) was the first attempt at representative democracy by the imperial government of the Ottoman Empire. Also known as the Ottoman Parliament, it was located in Constantinople (Istanbul) and was composed of two houses: an upper house (Senate, Meclis-i Âyân), and a lower house (Chamber of Deputies, Meclis-i Mebusân). 

The General Assembly was first constituted on 23 December 1876 and initially lasted until 14 February 1878, when it was dissolved by Sultan Abdul Hamid II.

As a result of the Young Turk Revolution which brought substantial reforms and larger participation by political parties, the General Assembly was revived 30 years later, on 23 July 1908, with the Second Constitutional Era. The Second Constitutional Era ended on 11 April 1920, when the General Assembly was dissolved by the Allies during the occupation of Constantinople in the aftermath of World War I.

Many members of the dissolved Ottoman Parliament in Constantinople later became members of the Grand National Assembly of Turkey in Ankara (known in English as Angora in the Ottoman and pre-1930 Republic eras), which was established on 23 April 1920, during the Turkish War of Independence.

See also
 Senate of the Ottoman Empire, the upper house
 Chamber of Deputies of the Ottoman Empire, the lower house
 History of the Ottoman Empire
 Ottoman constitution of 1876
 First Constitutional Era
 Second Constitutional Era
 Grand National Assembly of Turkey
The Ottomans: Europe's Muslim Emperors

References

Government of the Ottoman Empire
Organizations established in 1876
Ottoman Empire
1876 establishments in the Ottoman Empire